This is a list of Grambling State Tigers football players in the NFL Draft.

Key

Selections

Notes
Robert Smith was drafted into the 1984 NFL Supplemental Draft.

References

Grambling State

Grambling State Tigers NFL Draft